Broderick Dyke and Tom Nijssen were the defending champions, but Nijssen did not participate this year.  Dyke partnered Kelly Evernden, losing in the first round.

Andrés Gómez and Slobodan Živojinović won the title, defeating Boris Becker and Eric Jelen 7–5, 5–7, 6–3 in the final.

Seeds

  Ken Flach /  Robert Seguso (quarterfinals)
  Darren Cahill /  John Fitzgerald (first round)
  Marty Davis /  Brad Drewett (semifinals)
  Grant Connell /  Glenn Michibata (first round)

Draw

Draw

External links
Draw

Tennis tournaments in Japan
1988 Grand Prix (tennis)
1988 in Japanese tennis
1988,Doubles